The following is a list of rocket launchers.

List

References

 http://science.howstuffworks.com/rpg2.htm